Hashim Al-Sharfa (born 28 December 1972) is a Saudi Arabian sprinter. He competed in the men's 4 × 400 metres relay at the 1996 Summer Olympics.

References

External links
 

1972 births
Living people
Athletes (track and field) at the 1996 Summer Olympics
Saudi Arabian male sprinters
Olympic athletes of Saudi Arabia
Place of birth missing (living people)
20th-century Saudi Arabian people
21st-century Saudi Arabian people